OCT1 may refer to:

Proteins 
 SLC22A1 (solute carrier family 22 member 1)
 POU2F1 (POU domain, class 2, transcription factor 1)

Date 
 October 1